The 2020 UC Davis football team represented the University of California, Davis as a member of the Big Sky Conference during the 2020–21 NCAA Division I FCS football season. Led by fourth-year head coach Dan Hawkins, UC Davis compiled an overall record of 3–2 with an identical mark in conference play, tying for third place in the Big Sky. The Aggies played home games at UC Davis Health Stadium in Davis, California.

Previous season

The Aggies finished the 2019 season 5–7, 3–5 in Big Sky play to finish in a three-way tie for sixth place.

Preseason

Polls
On July 23, 2020, during the virtual Big Sky Kickoff, the Aggies were predicted to finish sixth in the Big Sky by both the coaches and media.

Schedule
UC Davis's game scheduled against San Diego was canceled on July 27 due to the Pioneer Football League's decision to play a conference-only schedule due to the COVID-19 pandemic.

References

UC Davis
UC Davis Aggies football seasons
UC Davis Aggies football